Drissa Traoré (born 25 March 1992) is an Ivorian professional footballer who plays as a midfielder for Championnat National 3 club Chantilly.

Club career
After playing in France for Le Havre, Traoré signed for English club Notts County on 1 September 2014. He was released by the club at the end of the 2014–15 season.

Traoré signed a one-year contract on 13 July 2015 with Swindon Town. He was suspended by the club in April 2016, alongside teammates Jeremy Balmy and Brandon Ormonde-Ottewill. Swindon Town launched a full investigation into the trio, after they were seen on social media inhaling nitrous oxide gas.

In June 2016, Traoré joined Forest Green Rovers on a two-year contract, linking up with his former Swindon Town manager Mark Cooper at The New Lawn. He helped Forest Green gain promotion to the Football League for the first time in their history on 14 May 2017 in the National League play-off final at Wembley Stadium, starting in a 3–1 win over Tranmere Rovers.

Traoré left Forest Green Rovers in February 2018, joining Tranmere Rovers in March 2018. He missed a visit to see family in France in order to complete the signing. He was released by Tranmere at the end of the 2017–18 season.

International career
Traoré has represented the Ivory Coast at under-20 youth level.

Career statistics

References

Living people
1992 births
People from Bouaké
Association football midfielders
Ivorian footballers
Ligue 2 players
Championnat National 2 players
Championnat National 3 players
English Football League players
National League (English football) players
Le Havre AC players
Notts County F.C. players
Swindon Town F.C. players
Forest Green Rovers F.C. players
Tranmere Rovers F.C. players
AS Beauvais Oise players
Ivorian expatriate footballers
Ivorian expatriate sportspeople in France
Expatriate footballers in France
Ivorian expatriate sportspeople in England
Expatriate footballers in England
Ivory Coast under-20 international footballers
US Chantilly players